Origin is a 2017 mystery thriller novel by American author Dan Brown and the fifth installment in his Robert Langdon series, following Inferno. The book was released on October 3, 2017, by Doubleday. The book is predominantly set in Spain and features minor sections in Sharjah and Budapest.

Plot
Edmond Kirsch, a billionaire philanthropist, computer scientist, futurist, and strident atheist, attends a meeting at the Santa Maria de Montserrat Abbey in Catalonia (Spain) with Roman Catholic Bishop Antonio Valdespino, Jewish Rabbi Yehuda Köves, and Muslim Imam Syed al-Fadl, members of the Parliament of the World's Religions. He informs them that he has made a revolutionary discovery that he plans to release to the public in a month. He has informed them out of respect, despite his hatred of organized religion, which he blames for his mother's death. The three learn that he is presenting it in three days' time, prompting Valdespino to demand that he stop.

Kirsch hosts an event at the Guggenheim Museum in Bilbao. Among those in attendance are Kirsch's former teacher, Robert Langdon, and the Guggenheim's curator Ambra Vidal, the fiancée of the future King of Spain, Prince Julián. The guests receive a headset through which they communicate with a voice named Winston, which reveals to Langdon that it is an artificial intelligence invented by Kirsch. Winston leads Langdon to a private meeting with Kirsch, who claims that his presentation will reveal humanity's origins and future.

During the presentation, which is broadcast worldwide, Kirsch reveals that he intends to end the age of religion and usher in an age of science. However, he is killed by Luis Ávila, a former naval admiral introduced to the controversial Palmarian Catholic Church following the deaths of his family in a bombing. Ávila was commissioned by "the Regent", someone claiming to be with the church. Meanwhile, both Al-Fadl and Köves are killed as well.

While Ávila escapes, Langdon meets Ambra. He warns her not to trust Julián (as Ávila was put on the guest list by request from the Royal palace) and they escape his guards and leave the museum, determined to release Kirsch's discovery. They steal Kirsch's phone and escape with the help of Winston, who has Kirsch's personal jet fly them to Barcelona. Ambra reveals that the presentation is protected by a 47-character password, a line from Kirsch's favorite poem. Neither know which poem was chosen, but they deduce that it can be found at Kirsch's home, on Antoni Gaudí's Casa Milà.

Meanwhile, the three murders have sparked worldwide outrage, fueled by information leaked by the anonymous source "Monte Iglesia". Word of the meeting in Catalonia spreads, and suspicion falls on Valdespino, who sneaks Julián off the palace grounds. To save face, the royal family's public relations manager claims that Langdon kidnapped Ambra.

Langdon and Ambra go to Casa Milà, and search for the poem. Langdon learns that Kirsch was dying of pancreatic cancer, prompting a rushed release of the presentation. Langdon finds that Kirsch owned a book of the complete works of William Blake, which he donated to Sagrada Família, leaving it open at a specific page. The police arrive and, as Ambra tries to explain she wasn't kidnapped, Kirsch's phone is destroyed. A helicopter with two Guardia Real agents arrives and gets her and Langdon to safety. Langdon assures Ambra that he can find Winston's physical location, so he can broadcast the discovery, and the helicopter takes them to Sagrada Família.

There, the two discover that the password is the final stanza of Four Zoas, "The dark Religions are departed & sweet Science reigns". On the Regent's orders, Ávila arrives, killing both agents and chasing Langdon and Ambra. In an ensuing fight, Ávila falls to his death. Langdon and Ambra escape the police in the helicopter.

Langdon finds Winston's source inside the Barcelona Supercomputing Center. They discover a device called E-Wave, a Mare Nostrum supercomputer  which Kirsch calls 'Quantum cube'. After entering the password, the presentation starts, to hundreds of millions of viewers. Kirsch explains that he simulated the Miller-Urey experiment,  using E-Wave's ability to digitally speed forward time, to recreate what he believes is the moment of abiogenesis. This is Kirsch's proof that humanity was created by natural events. He then claims that in roughly fifty years, humanity and technology will merge, hopefully creating a utopian future. The presentation sparks widespread debate. Ambra returns to the palace and Langdon is cleared of all charges. Winston reveals that, per Kirsch's will, he will self-delete the next day.

Meanwhile, Valdespino brings Julián to his dying father in the Valley of the Fallen. The King admits that he is homosexual and Valdespino is his platonic lover. Both tell Julián not to follow old traditions, but to do what he feels is right for the country. The King dies during the night and Valdespino takes his own life to be with him. Julián makes amends with Ambra, and they decide to start their courtship over.

The next day, going over all he has learned, Langdon realizes that Winston is Monte and the Regent. Winston had orchestrated Kirsch's murder to make him a martyr and destroy the Palmarians' reputation. He had intended for Ávila to be arrested, his death having been an accident. He then self-deletes, leaving Langdon shaken. Despite this, Langdon returns to Sagrada Família, where he and others of multiple races and religions are united by hope for the future.

Characters
 Robert Langdon: A U.S. professor of symbology at Harvard University, Cambridge and protagonist of the novel.
 Edmond Kirsch: A philanthropist, computer scientist, and futurist, as well as a strident atheist and a majorly unseen protagonist of the novel.
 Ambra Vidal: The director of the Guggenheim Museum Bilbao, fiancé of Spain's Prince Julian, and an associate of Edmond Kirsch.
 Winston: Edmond Kirsch's Supercomputer AI assistant, named after Winston Churchill.
 Julián: The prince and future king of Spain.
 Bishop Antonio Valdespino: The loyal bishop to the Spanish royal family and whom Kirsch meets at the beginning of the novel.
 Rabbi Yehuda Köves: A prominent Jewish philosopher.
 Syed al-Fadl: A prominent Islamic scholar.
 Admiral Luis Ávila: Ex-officer of Spanish Navy who has lost his wife and son to religious extremism and later becomes a devout member of Palmarian Catholic Church and secondary antagonist of the novel.
 Commander Garza: Commander of the Guardia Real.
 Fonseca: Guardia Real Agent
 Rafa Díaz: Guardia Real Agent who assists Vidal.
 Father Beña: A priest of Sagrada Família.
 Mónica Martín: Public Relations Coordinator, Spanish Palace.
 Agent Suresh Bhalla: Surveillance specialist, Spanish Palace.

Production 
Brown visited many of the places in the book, for example the Guggenheim in Bilbao. He spent a great deal of time in Spain. Brown wrote and researched the book for four years. It is dedicated to his mother, who died in 2017. It had an initial printing of 2 million copies, with printing set for 42 languages.

Reception
The New York Times complimented the book for focusing on "serious ideas" relating to religion and atheism, and whether religion and science can co-exist. It also said the book had a "geeky" humor. The Guardian found the apocalyptic "witches brew" of themes to be relevant to modern times, but it also noted the characters' dialogue made them sound like "cybernauts". Another Guardian review said the book was fun "in its own galumphing way."

The Washington Post panned the book, calling the themes and writing style "worn-out." USA Today gave it a score of 2.5/4 and said it was a "only a fitfully entertaining religious rehash of his greatest hits," but said fans of Langdon would like it. The Daily Telegraph said it was "light on action" and focused more on historical factoids and intellectual ideas, to its benefit. It gave it 3 of 5 stars. The review called Brown a good communicator but a "lousy" storyteller.

In August 2018, the book was #1 on The New York Times bestseller list. It had been on the list for 23 weeks.

References

External links
 Official website
 Robert Langdon chases clues, and God, in Dan Brown's 'Origin', by Brian Truitt, USA Today, October 2, 2017
 Origin illustrated guide 
 The Keys to Dan Brown's Origin

2017 American novels
Novels by Dan Brown
Doubleday (publisher) books
American mystery novels
American thriller novels
Novels set in Barcelona
Novels about artificial intelligence
Novels about museums